Alfred Edward Taylor (22 December 1869 – 31 October 1945), usually cited as A. E. Taylor, was a British idealist philosopher most famous for his contributions to the philosophy of idealism in his writings on metaphysics, the philosophy of religion, moral philosophy, and the scholarship of Plato. He was a fellow of the British Academy (1911) and president of the Aristotelian Society from 1928 to 1929. At Oxford he was made an honorary fellow of New College in 1931. In an age of universal upheaval and strife, he was a notable defender of Idealism in the Anglophone world.

Career
Taylor was both a philosopher in his own right, addressing all the central problems of philosophy, and a philosophical scholar.

Educated at Oxford in the closing days of the great European idealist movement, Taylor was early influenced by the school of British idealism, especially neo-Hegelianism. He was educated at New College, where he obtained a First in Literae Humaniores or 'Greats' in 1891 and held a prize fellowship at Merton College (1891–96); he was re-elected as a Fellow in 1902. His first major book, Elements of Metaphysics (1903), dedicated (in heartfelt acknowledgment) to F. H. Bradley, is a systematic treatise of metaphysics covering such topics as ontology, cosmology, and rational psychology, and influenced by scholars including Josiah Royce, James Ward, George Frederick Stout, Richard Avenarius, and Hugo Munsterberg, as well as Robert Adamson, Wilhelm Ostwald, Bertrand Russell, and even Louis Couturat.

In later years, most notably in The Faith of a Moralist, Taylor began to move away from certain doctrines of his early idealistic youth, towards a more mature and comprehensive idealist philosophy. While students at Oxford and Cambridge were in thrall of anti-idealism, Taylor for many years influenced generations of young people at the University of St. Andrews (1908–1924) and the University of Edinburgh (1924–1941), two of the most ancient and prestigious universities of the United Kingdom, where he was Professor of Moral Philosophy.

As a philosophical scholar he is considered, alongside Francis Macdonald Cornford, one of the greatest English Platonists of his time. In the first half of the 20th century, Taylor remained, in a reactionary age of anti-metaphysics and growing political irrationalism, a lonely but stalwart defender of 19th century European philosophical idealism in the English-speaking world.

But his scholarship was not confined to Greek philosophy. In 1938 Taylor published in Philosophy, 13, 406–24, a landmark article, "The Ethical Doctrine of Hobbes". This argues that 'Hobbes's ethical theory is logically independent of the egoistic psychology and is a strict deontology' (Stuart Brown, 'The Taylor Thesis', Hobbes Studies, ed. K. Thomas, Oxford: Blackwell, 1965: 31). (The text of Taylor's article is reprinted in the same volume.) The deontological angle was developed, though with divergencies from Taylor's argument, by Howard Warrender in The Political Philosophy of Hobbes, Oxford: Oxford University Press, 1957.

Major contributions
As a scholar of Plato, he is perhaps most famous for presenting evidence in support of the position the vast majority of the statements of Socrates in the Platonic dialogues accurately depict ideas of the historical man himself. His magnum opus, Plato: The Man and His Work (1926) and his commentary on the Timaeus (1927) are particularly important contributions to the higher learning of his time.

In moral philosophy he explored such issues as free will and the relationship between rightness and goodness. Taylor was greatly influenced by the thought of classical antiquity, by such philosophers as Plato and Aristotle, as well as medieval scholasticism.

His contribution to the philosophy of religion is mainly his 1926–28 Gifford Lectures, "The Faith of a Moralist" (1930). Taylor made many contributions to the philosophical journal, Mind.  He wrote some of the major articles in James Hastings' Encyclopedia of Religion and Ethics.

Selected works

References

External links
 

1869 births
1945 deaths
British philosophers
Alumni of New College, Oxford
Presidents of the Aristotelian Society
Idealists
Fellows of the British Academy
Fellows of New College, Oxford
Academics of the University of St Andrews
Academics of the University of Edinburgh
Philosophy academics
Fellows of Merton College, Oxford